What Planet You On? is a 2008 single by Bodyrox the name for English DJs Jon Pearn and Nick Bridges. The single features vocals and also a video performance from singer Luciana. The single was released in the UK on 7 January 2008. The single first appeared as an exclusive on the mix compilation 'GeneratioNext: The House2Hard Theory' mixed by Bodyrox on September 15, 2007.

Other uses
It was also featured on the soundtrack of EA Sports football game, FIFA 08, and on the North American TV commercial for the 2008 Ford Focus. On 5 January 2008, this song was also featured on a promo for Cycle 9 of America's Next Top Model in the UK. In 2009 it was used on BBC Three's "Born on Three" trailer.

In 2008, the track was remixed by Canadian electronic dance artist deadmau5.

It is also featured in the 2009 British horror film Tormented.

References

External links 
 Single review on Dance Energy
 Single review on I Really Love Music

2008 songs
2008 singles
Bodyrox songs
Songs written by Nick Clow
Songs written by Luciana Caporaso